King's Circle (station code: KCE) is a railway station on the Harbour line of the Mumbai Suburban Railway network. King's Circle and Matunga stations are next to each other albeit the latter is on the Central line. It is named after the King's Circle Park, which was named after George V, the King-Emperor. The trains passing through King's Circle station are only the ones going to Bandra, Andheri and Goregaon from CSMT or Panvel and vice versa.

See also
Maheshwari Udyan, Mumbai
Mumbai Suburban Railway 

Railway stations in Mumbai City district
Mumbai Suburban Railway stations
Mumbai CR railway division